Charity Island is an islet with an area of 0.6 ha in south-eastern Australia.  It is part of the Partridge Island Group, lying close to the south-eastern coast of Tasmania, in the D'Entrecasteaux Channel between Bruny Island and the mainland.  Its neighbouring islets are named "Faith" and "Hope".

Fauna
Recorded breeding seabird species are Pacific gull and kelp gull.

See also

List of islands of Tasmania

References

Islands of South East Tasmania